Calthalotia fragum, common name the spotted strawberry top shell or the comtesse's top shell, is a species of sea snail, a marine gastropod mollusk in the family Trochidae, the top snails.

Description
The size of an adult shell of this species varies between 8 mm and 25 mm.

Distribution
This marine species occurs off Southeast Australia, Queensland, Victoria, New South Wales and Japan.

References

 Wood, W. 1828. Index Testaceologicus; or A Catalogue of Shells, British and Foreign, arranged according to the Linnean system. London : Taylor Supplement, 1-59, pls 1-8.
 Adams, A. 1853. Contributions towards a monograph of the Trochidae, a family of gastropodous Mollusca. Proceedings of the Zoological Society of London 1851(19): 150-192
 Philippi, R.A. 1855. Trochidae. pp. 249–328 in Küster, H.C. (ed). Systematisches Conchylien-Cabinet von Martini und Chemnitz. Nürnberg : Bauer & Raspe Vol. 2.
 Hedley, C. 1901. Studies on Australian Mollusca. Part IV. Proceedings of the Linnean Society of New South Wales 26: 16-25
 Allan, J.K. 1950. Australian Shells: with related animals living in the sea, in freshwater and on the land. Melbourne : Georgian House xix, 470 pp., 45 pls, 112 text figs.
 Iredale, T. & McMichael, D.F. 1962. A reference list of the marine Mollusca of New South Wales. Memoirs of the Australian Museum 11: 1-109
 Short, J.W. & Potter, D.G. 1987. Shells of Queensland and The Great Barrier Reef. Drummoyne, NSW : Golden press Pty Ltd 135 pp., 60 pl.
 Hickman, C.S. & McLean, J.H. 1990. Systematic revision and suprageneric classification of trochacean gastropods. Natural History Museum of Los Angeles County. Science Series 35: i-vi, 1-169
 Wilson B. (1993) Australian marine shells. Prosobranch gastropods. Vol. 1. Odyssey Publishing, Kallaroo, Western Australia, 408 pp

External links
 Philippi, R.A. 1846. Diagnoses testaceorum quorundam novarum. Malakozoologische Blätter 1846: 97-106
 Philippi, R.A. 1849. Centuria altera Testaceorum novorum. Zeitschrift für Malakozoologie 5: 99-112
 Tenison-Woods, J.E. 1879. On some new marine shells from Moreton Bay. Proceedings of the Linnean Society of New South Wales 4(1): 108-111
 Iredale, T. (1931). Australian molluscan notes. Nº I. Records of the Australian Museum. 18: 201-235 
 To World Register of Marine Species
 

fragum
Gastropods of Australia
Gastropods described in 1931